Ian Douglas Fisher (born 31 March 1976, Bradford, West Yorkshire, England) is an English first-class cricketer. He is a left-handed batsman and a left-arm slow bowler.
He made his first-class debut in April 1996 during Yorkshire's preseason tour of Zimbabwe, and in his first innings took 5 for 35 against a Mashonaland Invitation XI. However, the surge in form of Richard Dawson stopped Fisher from progressing with Yorkshire, and he moved to Gloucestershire for the 2002 season. He had a decent summer, scoring over 500 runs and taking more than 30 wickets in first-class cricket; he also scored 103 not out against Essex, which remains his only first-class century.

Fisher helped Gloucestershire to promotion to Division One in the County Championship in 2003, but gradually fell away from first-team contention: by 2008 Twenty20 was the only form of the game where he was only playing more than a handful of matches. In 2009, he left Gloucestershire to join Worcestershire, but he was not retained at the end of the season.

References

External links

1976 births
Living people
English cricketers
Yorkshire cricketers
Gloucestershire cricketers
Worcestershire cricketers
Cricketers from Bradford
English cricketers of 1969 to 2000
English cricketers of the 21st century